The Imbaba Bridge is a railway bridge located in Cairo, Egypt across the Nile River, about  downstream from Aswan Dam. It is the only railway bridge across the Nile in Cairo. The current version was built between 1912 and 1924 by the Belgian firm Baume-Marpent.
The first iteration was constructed in 1891 to let trains cross the Nile west to the Giza Train Station.

References 

Bridges in Cairo
1924 establishments in Egypt
Bridges completed in 1924